WDHN (channel 18) is a television station in Dothan, Alabama, United States, affiliated with ABC and owned by Nexstar Media Group. The station's studios and transmitter are located on AL 52 in Webb.

History

WDHN launched August 7, 1970, as the area's second television station and aired an analog signal on UHF channel 18. It was owned by Dothan businessman Betts Slingluff, Jr. and a partnership of other local investors. Before that time, southeastern Alabama relied on WTVY to carry all three major broadcast networks. WTVY was primarily a CBS affiliate, so conventional wisdom suggested that WDHN, as the second station in a small, two-station market, should have opted to affiliate with the NBC network rather than with ABC, because ABC was the smallest and weakest network and would not be anywhere near par with CBS and NBC in terms of ratings until later in the decade. However, geography played a decisive part in WDHN joining ABC. The Alabama side of the Dothan media market received a fairly strong signal from WSFA-TV, Montgomery's NBC station. Further, at the time the station started up, no ABC affiliate provided even a grade B signal to the Wiregrass. The only nearby ABC programs then were on WJHG-TV in Panama City, Florida on a part-time basis (that station would move to full-time ABC affiliation by 1972; currently it is an NBC affiliate).

In 1979, reflecting an era when small, locally owned stations were losing profitability, Slingluff's group sold WDHN to Hi Ho Television, which also owned WVGA in Valdosta, Georgia. That same year it added the -TV suffix. In 1986, Hi Ho sold WDHN and WVGA to Morris Multimedia. It dropped the -TV suffix in 1998. In 2003, Nexstar purchased WDHN, along with KARK-TV in Little Rock, Arkansas, from Morris.

As part of the DTV transition in 2009, WDHN turned off its analog transmitter and began broadcasting exclusively in digital.

On January 27, 2016, it was announced that Nexstar would buy Media General for $4.6 billion. WDHN, along with recently acquired Fox affiliate WZDX in Huntsville (which Nexstar would later sell in 2019 to Tegna in order to acquire Tribune Media, owner of WHNT-TV), became a part of "Nexstar Media Group" and joined a cluster of stations Nexstar would own in Alabama including WIAT in Birmingham and WKRG-TV in Mobile, as well as WRBL in Columbus, Georgia, which covers much of east Alabama including Opelika and Auburn. All three of these stations are CBS affiliates.

On June 15, 2016, Nexstar announced that it had entered into an affiliation agreement with Katz Broadcasting for the Escape (now Ion Mystery), Laff, Grit, and Bounce TV networks (the last one of which is owned by Bounce Media LLC, whose COO Jonathan Katz is president/CEO of Katz Broadcasting), bringing one or more of the four networks to 81 stations owned and/or operated by Nexstar, including WDHN (Bounce TV and Grit are already available in the area on digital subchannels of WDFX-TV).

News operation
WDHN produces four and a half hours of news each weekday starting with Wake Up Wiregrass at 5 a.m., Daytime at 11 a.m., and then in the evening with WDHN News at 5, 6 and 10 p.m. Wake Up Wiregrass replaced Top of the Morning with Charlie Platt after its cancellation. The newscast airs weekday mornings from 5 to 7 a.m. (6 to 7 a.m. from relaunch until February 1, 2021).

Historically, WDHN has been a very distant second in the ratings behind WTVY. This is partly because for much of the analog era, WDHN only broadcast at 1.06 million watts, which was somewhat modest for a Big Four affiliate on the UHF band. It also had to deal with competition from WSFA, which was available on Wiregrass cable systems for decades. The signal disadvantage has been lessened somewhat in the digital era, as WDHN's digital signal operates at a full million watts, equivalent to five million watts in analog.

On December 19, 2017, WDHN unveiled a brand new set and began broadcasting local news in high definition.

On June 1, 2020, WDHN began producing an hour-long 9 p.m. newscast for Fox affiliate WDFX, replacing a prior arrangement where news was provided by WSFA out of Montgomery.. 

On February 1, 2021, WDHN expanded morning news to two hours.

On February 15, 2021, WDHN added an 11 a.m. hour-long newscast with Michael Rinker as anchor. Katrice Nolan would join him a few months later as co-anchor. 

On September 18, 2021, WDHN launched weekend newscasts at 6 p.m. and 10 p.m. on Saturdays and 5:30 p.m. and 10 p.m. on Sundays.

Subchannels
The station's digital signal is multiplexed:

References

External links
 

ABC network affiliates
Ion Mystery affiliates
Laff (TV network) affiliates
Cozi TV affiliates
Television channels and stations established in 1970
DHN
1970 establishments in Alabama
Nexstar Media Group